The orange-crowned oriole (Icterus auricapillus) is a species of bird in the family Icteridae. It is found in eastern Panama, Colombia and Venezuela.

Its natural habitats are subtropical or tropical dry forests, subtropical or tropical moist lowland forests, and heavily degraded former forest.

Gallery

References

orange-crowned oriole
Birds of Colombia
Birds of Venezuela
orange-crowned oriole
Taxonomy articles created by Polbot